Niepars is an Amt in the district of Vorpommern-Rügen, in Mecklenburg-Vorpommern, Germany. The seat of the Amt is in Niepars.

The Amt Niepars consists of the following municipalities:
Groß Kordshagen
Jakobsdorf
Lüssow
Niepars
Pantelitz
Steinhagen
Wendorf
Zarrendorf

References

Ämter in Mecklenburg-Western Pomerania